City Lights - Classic Performances by Lou Reed is a compilation album by Lou Reed.

Track listing
"Coney Island Baby" (live)
"Berlin" (live)
"Satellite Of Love" (live)
"Senselessly Cruel"
"Temporary Thing"
"Gimmie Some Good Times"
"City Lights"
"Looking For Love"
"Think It Over"

Origin of the Tracks

Tracks 1 - 3  from the Live LP Take No Prisoners

Tracks 4 & 5 from the LP Rock And Roll Heart

Track 6 from the LP Street Hassle

Tracks 7 & 8 from the LP The Bells

Track 9 from the LP Growing Up In Public

References

Lou Reed compilation albums
1985 compilation albums
Arista Records compilation albums